Events from the year 1356 in China.

Incumbents
 Yuan dynasty – Ukhaghatu Khan Toghon Temür

Events 
 Zhu Yuanzhang's rebel force captured the city of Nanjing, which he would later establish as the capital of the Ming dynasty.

Deaths 
 Toqto'a (1314－1356), Yuan dynasty official who was murdered

References

Citations

Bibliography
 

14th century in China
 1356 by country